Acton is an unincorporated community in Taylor County, Kentucky, United States.  It lies along Route 70 east of the city of Campbellsville, the county seat of Taylor County.  Its elevation is 728 feet (222 m).

References

Unincorporated communities in Taylor County, Kentucky
Unincorporated communities in Kentucky